Putyla (formerly Storonets-Putyliv) is an urban-type settlement in Vyzhnytsia Raion, Chernivtsi Oblast (province) in western Ukraine. It hosts the administration of Putyla settlement hromada, one of the hromadas of Ukraine. At the 2001 census, the town's population was 3,265. Current population:

History
The town of Putyla was first mentioned in 1501 along with other local settlements, which the Polish Crown gave to Ioan Tăutu for settling the peace between Poland and Principality of Moldavia. In 1817, the local villagers complained to Holy Roman Emperor Francis II that they have had their taxes increased the past 10 years. In 1843, the villagers were informed that they could no longer use and cultivate the nearby forest, after which an uprising occurred, resulting in the imprisonment of 14 local leaders.

Until 18 July 2020, Putyla served as an administrative center of Putyla Raion. The raion was abolished in July 2020 as part of the administrative reform of Ukraine, which reduced the number of raions of Chernivtsi Oblast to three. The area of Putyla Raion was merged into Vyzhnytsia Raion.

References

Urban-type settlements in Vyzhnytsia Raion
Bukovina
Populated places established in 1501
1501 establishments in Europe
16th-century establishments in Ukraine